The Iran–Iraq War was an armed conflict between the Islamic Republic of Iran and the Republic of Iraq lasting from September 1980 to August 1988. The following list contains Iraqi victories by known Iraqi pilots. Note the list is far from complete. The confirmed victories are bold and probable victories are italic in the column of victims.

References 

Airstrikes during the Iran–Iraq War
Iran–Iraq War flying aces
Aerial victories
Iraqi aviators